Levieria is a genus of flowering plants belonging to the family Monimiaceae. They are dioecious trees or shrubs.

It is native to Sulawesi, the Maluku Islands, New Guinea and Queensland (north-eastern Australia).

The genus name of Levieria is in honour of Emilio Levier (1839–1911), a Swiss-born Italian botanist, mycologist and plant collector in Florence. 
It was first described and published in Malesia Vol.1 on page 192 in 1877.

Known species
According to Kew:
Levieria acuminata 
Levieria beccariana 
Levieria montana 
Levieria nitens 
Levieria orientalis 
Levieria scandens 
Levieria squarrosa

References

Monimiaceae
Monimiaceae genera
Dioecious plants
Plants described in 1877
Flora of Sulawesi
Flora of the Maluku Islands
Flora of New Guinea
Flora of Queensland